The Berbalangs are mythical creatures in Filipino culture, described as ghouls who eat human flesh.  They feed by digging up corpses from graveyards or by hunting living humans using flight and other supernatural powers.  They are associated with the culture of the smaller towns of Mindanao.  The lore on Berbalangs has similarities with that on Aswang creatures.

Description 

Published information on the subject is based on a single report by Ethelbert Forbes Skertchly, a resident of Hong Kong and an officer in the British Navy, son of the better known Sydney Barber Josiah Skertchly.  E. F. Skertchly discussed the Berbalangs in an article published in 1896 by the Asiatic Society of Bengal.  According to that report, based on Skertchly's visit to the island of Cagayan Sulu, now known as Mapun,

Influence of Skertchly's description 
The report by E. F. Skertchly is unusual in that he wrote as if he had personally witnessed some of the supernatural powers associated with the Berbalangs.  The Scottish writer Andrew Lang introduced the Berbalangs as a plot point in the story "Adventure of the Fair American", included in the book The Disentanglers (1902).  In that book, Lang explicitly cites Skertchley's account of the Berbalangs of Cagayan Sulu.

Skertchly's article in the Journal of the Asiatic Society of Bengal also attracted the attention of English academic and ghost-story writer M. R. James, who in turn introduced it to Rupert T. Gould circa 1911.  Gould discussed the subject and reproduced Skertchly's account of the Berbalangs in a chapter of his popular book Oddities, first published in 1928.  Modern awareness of the Berbalang lore largely derives from Gould's book.

In popular culture 

 The Berbalang was included as a monster in the popular fantasy game Dungeons & Dragons.  
 An episode of The CW show Legacies, released in 2021, also references Berbalangs. The Berbalangs introduced in that episode have many similarities to those mentioned in the legend - red necrotic eyes, an insatiable appetite for dead flesh and an ability to interact with the astral plane. They also possess the ability to turn a human into a Berbalang through physical contact. In the episode, the protagonist Hope Mikaelson is bitten by a Berbalang and begins transforming. Her friends use a pearl-bladed dagger imbued with magic to reverse the transformation and bring her back (this method is similar to using a coconut pearl or a kris rubbed with lime juice to repel Berbalangs, as described in the legend).

References

Philippine legendary creatures